The William Nicks Building is a 4,000-seat multi-purpose arena in Prairie View, Texas. It is home to the Prairie View A&M University Panthers basketball team, volleyball team, and commencement.  As part of renovation projects in 2011–2012, every seat is chairback.  Locker rooms were renovated in 2014.  The building is nicknamed the "Baby Dome" as a result of its structural configuration.

See also
 List of NCAA Division I basketball arenas

References

Basketball venues in Texas
College basketball venues in the United States
Indoor arenas in Texas
Sports venues in Texas
Volleyball venues in Texas